Didesmandra is a monotypic genus of flowering plants belonging to the family Dilleniaceae. The only species is Didesmandra aspera.

Its native range is Borneo.

References

Dilleniaceae
Monotypic eudicot genera